Gary Alexander may refer to:

 Gary Alexander (baseball) (born 1953), US baseball player
 Gary Alexander (basketball) (born 1969), American basketball player
 Gary Alexander (footballer) (born 1979), English footballer
 Gary Alexander (sound engineer), American sound engineer
 Gary Alexander (martial art pioneer), American martial artist
 Gary Alexander (politician), American politician in Washington
 Gary Alexander (wrestler) (born 1944), American Olympic wrestler
 Jules Gary Alexander from the band the Association, known also as Gary Alexander

See also
Alexander (surname)